Badangi mandal is one of the 34 mandals in Vizianagaram district of Andhra Pradesh, India. Badangi is the headquarters of the mandal.
In Early 18th century Pinpenki, Badangi, Anavaram and kusumur ruled by Shri Ravu Venkata Rayanym Dora Garu ( who is also family of Bobbili Rajha's ) now their family also residing in Pinapenki near Gadhaba valasa their family members Started "RVR Foundation" on the name of Shri Ravu Vittal Rao Dora Garu to help poor children. Founder & President "Shri Ravu Venkata Aditya Mohan", He is conducting child development activities and giving financial / moral support.
The mandal is bounded by Bobbili, Therlam, Merakamudidam and Ramabhadrapuram mandals.

Demographics 

 census, the mandal had a population of 48,219. The total population constitute, 24,357 males and 23,862 females. The entire population is rural in nature.

Government and politics 

Badangi mandal is one of the four mandals in Bobbili (Assembly constituency), which in turn is a part of Vizianagaram (Lok Sabha constituency), one of the 25 Lok Sabha constituencies representing Andhra Pradesh. The present MLA is Sambangi Venkata China Appala Naidu, who won the Andhra Pradesh Legislative Assembly election, 2019 representing Yuvajana Sramika Rythu Congress Party.

Rural villages
 2011 census of India, the mandal has 27 settlements, consisting of 27 villages. Koduru is the most populated and D. Venkayyapeta is the least populated village in the mandal.

The settlements in the mandal are listed below:

References 

Mandals in Vizianagaram district